The Community of Latin American and Caribbean States (CELAC) is a regional bloc of Latin American and Caribbean states proposed on February 23, 2010, at the Rio Group–Caribbean Community Unity Summit, and created on December 3, 2011, in Caracas, Venezuela, with the signature of The Declaration of Caracas. It consists of 33 countries in Latin America and the Caribbean having five official languages.

CELAC was created to deepen Latin American integration and to reduce the significant influence of the United States on the politics and economics of Latin America. It is seen as an alternative to the Organization of American States (OAS), a regional body that was founded by United States and 21 other Latin American nations as a countermeasure to potential Soviet influence in the region. Cuba, which was suspended from the OAS in 1962 and has since refused to rejoin, is a member of CELAC.

CELAC is the successor of the Rio Group and the Latin American and Caribbean Summit on Integration and Development (CALC). In July 2010, CELAC selected President of Venezuela Hugo Chávez and President of Chile Sebastián Piñera, as co-chairs of the forum to draft statutes for the organization.

Brazil decided to suspend its participation in the Community of Latin American and Caribbean States in January 2020 under the administration of Jair Bolsonaro. Following the 2022 Brazilian general election, newly elected president Luiz Inácio Lula da Silva signalled his intention to rejoin the Community of Latin American and Caribbean States, effectively doing so in the first days of his administration.

History

2008–2010: Brazil and Mexico initiatives 

The immediate predecessor of the CELAC is the Rio Group. Formed in 1986, it gathered 24 Latin American and Caribbean countries around summits to cooperate regional policy issue independently of the United States.

On 16–17 December 2008, the I Latin American and Caribbean Summit on Integration and Development (CALC) took place in Costa do Sauipe, Bahia, Brazil. It was organized at the initiative of the Lula administration with the goal of building cooperation mechanism with greater autonomy from the United States and Canada. Most heads of state from Latin America and the Caribbean states attended, with the exception of President of Colombia Álvaro Uribe and President of Peru Alan García. The summit finished with the signing of the Bahia Declaration, a common agenda establishing the following priorities: cooperation between mechanism of regional and subregional integration, the global financial crisis, energy, infrastructures, social development and eradication of hunger and poverty, food security, sustainable development, natural disasters, human rights promotion, migration, South–South cooperation and Latin America and Caribbean projection.

In 2008, the Calderón administration of Mexico proposed the creation of the Latin American and the Caribbean Union (Spanish: Unión Latinoamericana y del Caribe, ULC). The proposal was formalized on 27 March 2009 at Rio Group meeting. At the initiative of Mexico, the XXI Rio Summit and the II CALC summit were held together on 22–23 February 2010 in Playa del Carmen, Mexico. The joint summit was named the Latin American and Caribbean Unity Summit and the 33 attending states decided to create the Community of Latin American and Caribbean States (CELAC), which would be formally established in 2011.

Hugo Chávez, Luiz Inácio Lula da Silva and Rafael Correa were among the other prominent left-wing leaders who praised the creation of CELAC.

The announcement prompted debate and discussion across Latin America and the Caribbean about whether it was more beneficial to have close ties with U.S. and Canada or to work independently.

Raúl Zibechi, writing for Mexico's center-left La Jornada newspaper said, "The creation of the Community of Latin American and Caribbean States is part of a global and continental shift, characterized by the decline of U.S. hegemony and the rise of a group of regional blocs that form part of the new global balance."

An editorial in Brazil's Estadão newspaper said, "CELAC reflects the disorientation of the region's governments in relation to its problematic environment and its lack of foreign policy direction, locked as it is into the illusion that snubbing the United States will do for Latin American integration what 200 years of history failed to do."

2011: Founding 

CELAC's inaugural summit was due to be held in mid-2011, but was postponed because of the ill-health of Hugo Chávez, president of the host nation, Venezuela. The summit was instead held on December 2 and 3, 2011 in Caracas. It primarily focused on the global economic crisis and its effects on the region. Several leaders, including presidents Cristina Fernández de Kirchner, Dilma Rousseff and Juan Manuel Santos, encouraged an increase in regional trade, economic development, and further economic cooperation among members in order to defend their growing economies.

Chavez, and other leaders such as Rafael Correa and Daniel Ortega, expressed hope that the bloc would work to further Latin American integration, end U.S. hegemony and consolidate control over regional affairs. Chavez, citing the Monroe Doctrine as the original confirmation of U.S. interference in the region, openly called for CELAC to replace the OAS: "As the years go by, CELAC is going to leave behind the old and worn-out OAS." Correa called for a new human rights commission to replace the Inter-American Commission on Human Rights. Other leaders argued that the organisation should be used as a tool to resolve regional disagreements and uphold democratic values, but not as a replacement of the OAS. Santos stated that he would like to see dialogue within the group over whether existing counter-drug regulations should be revised. The president of the Latin American Parliament (Parlatino) said he expects that Parlatino will become the main legislative institution of CELAC. Amongst the key issues on the agenda were the creation of a "new financial architecture," sanction for maintaining the legal status of coca in Bolivia and the rejection of the Cuban embargo by the U.S.

United States President Barack Obama's senior adviser on Latin America, Daniel Restrepo, informed reporters from Miami that the U.S. government would "watch and see what direction CELAC takes".

2013 Summit – Chile 

The EU-LAC Foundation chose CELAC to be the main organization representative of the relationship between European and Latin American and Caribbean countries.

2014 Summit – Cuba 

During the summit, the region was declared a "peace zone". After three days and with the approval of participating representatives, a document with 83 focus points was created. It emphasized that, despite cultural and regional differences, unity between the participating countries is necessary in order to create progress. "Unity and the integration of our region must be gradually constructed, with flexibility, with respect to differences, diversity, and the sovereign right of each of our countries to choose our own forms of political and economic organization" stated the document. It also states which countries have been developing the best and how they are doing it in order for them to be a model for other countries.

The issue of poverty was widely discussed. Cuba's Raul Castro pointing out that throughout Latin America and the Caribbean, people want a fairer distribution of wealth, access to affordable education, employment, better salaries, and the eradication of illiteracy. He argued that CELAC countries can work together, support each other, to create new plans and solutions for these problems.

2015 Summit – Costa Rica

2016 Summit – Ecuador

2017 Summit – Dominican Republic

2021 Summit – Mexico

Organization 

The CELAC has six organs:
 The summit of Heads of State and Government.
 The meeting of Ministers of Foreign Affairs.
 The meeting of National Coordinators.
 The pro tempore presidency.
 The Troika.

The pro tempore presidency is the main representative of the CELAC. The troika is composed by the current pro tempore presidency, its predecessor, its successor and the presidency of the CARICOM.

Summits list

Member states

CELAC comprises 33 countries, speaking five different languages:
Eighteen Spanish-speaking countries

Twelve English-speaking countries

One Dutch-speaking country

One French-speaking country

One Portuguese-speaking country

Twelve members are in South America. Portuguese-speaking Brazil suspended its membership in January 2020, alleging that the organization failed to "protect democracy" in member states. The decision was taken during the presidency of Jair Bolsonaro, who was himself accused of attacking Brazil's democratic institutions. Following the 2022 Brazilian general election, newly elected president Luiz Inácio Lula da Silva signalled his intention to rejoin. After taking office Lula reinstated Brazil's membership into the organization.

Indicators
The following table shows various data for CELAC member states, including area, population, economic output and income inequality, as well as various composite indices, including human development, viability of the state, rule of law, perception of corruption, economic freedom, state of peace, freedom of the press and democratic level.

Forums 
The regional body has joint forums that work with external global entities. Including: China, and the European Union.

See also 

Latin American Integration Association (ALADI)
Bolivarian Alliance for the Peoples of Our America (ALBA)
Caribbean Community (CARICOM)
EU–LAC Foundation
Lima Group
Mercosur
Rio Group
Union of South American Nations (UNASUR)
United Nations Economic Commission for Latin America and the Caribbean

Notes

References

Bibliography

External links 

 

 
Intergovernmental organizations
International organizations based in the Americas
International organizations based in the Caribbean
Organizations based in Latin America
Organizations established in 2010
Pan-Americanism